Isaac Hopkins (9 November 1870 – 25 October 1913) was an Australian cricketer. He played one first-class cricket match for Victoria in 1903.

See also
 List of Victoria first-class cricketers

References

External links
 

1870 births
1913 deaths
Australian cricketers
Victoria cricketers
Cricketers from Melbourne